Myxodes ornatus is a species of clinid native to the Pacific coast of Chile, South America.

References

ornatus
Fish described in 1974
Taxa named by Victor G. Springer
Endemic fauna of Chile